Lloyd Clark FRHS (born 1967) is professorial research fellow in the Humanities Research Institute of the University of Buckingham. As a professor, he teaches Modern War Studies and Contemporary Military History. He is a leading military historian in the UK.

Selected publications
A History of the First World War (Hutchinson, 2002)
The Orne Bridgehead (Sutton, 2004)
Operation Epsom (Sutton, 2004)
Operation Market Garden – September 1944 (Sutton, 2004)
Anzio – The Friction of War – Italy and the Battle for Rome 1944 (UK: Headline, 2006; US: Grove Atlantic, 2006)
Arnhem – Jumping the Rhine 1944-45 (UK: Headline, 2008; US: Grove Atlantic, 2008)
Kursk – The Greatest Battle – Eastern Front 1943 (UK: Headline, 2011; US: Grove Atlantic, 2011)
Blitzkrieg: Myth, Reality, and Hitler’s Lightning War: France 1940 (UK: Atlantic, 2016; US: Grove Atlantic, 2016).

References 

Living people
1967 births
Fellows of the Royal Historical Society
British military historians
Academics of the University of Buckingham